Shamir may refer to:

People
Shamir (musician), American singer-songwriter Shamir, aka Shamir Bailey
Yitzhak Shamir, former Israeli Prime Minister
Adi Shamir (born 1952), Israeli cryptographer
Dan Shamir (born 1975), Israeli professional basketball coach
Gabriel and Maxim Shamir, Israeli graphic designers
Israel Shamir, Russian-Israeli-Swedish writer

Other
Shamir's Secret Sharing, an algorithm in cryptography created by Adi Shamir.
Solomon's shamir, a worm described in the Talmud and Midrash as being capable of cutting through or disintegrating stone, used in the construction of the First Temple in Jerusalem
Shamir, Israel, an Israeli kibbutz